Victor Andres Plata (born April 1, 1973) is a triathlete from the United States. He is a native of Minneapolis, Minnesota and his hometown is Santa Cruz, California.

 Mr. Plata competed at the second Olympic triathlon at the 2004 Summer Olympics.  He placed twenty-seventh with a total time of 1:57:09.09.  Plata was the alternate for the U.S. Olympic Team in 2000.  In 2005 Plata was ranked as high as 4th in the International Triathlon Union World Rankings for triathlon.

In 1997 Plata graduated from California Polytechnic State University in San Luis Obispo with a Bachelor of Science degree in social sciences.

External links
Victor Plata's U.S. Olympic Team biography
Victor Plata's International Triathlon Union athlete profile

1973 births
Living people
Triathletes at the 2003 Pan American Games
Triathletes at the 2004 Summer Olympics
American male triathletes
Olympic triathletes of the United States
Sportspeople from Minneapolis
Pan American Games competitors for the United States